Samuel Greven (born 8 July 1973) is a retired professional Belgian footballer.

Club career
Greven started his professional career with Antwerp, but due to lack of playing opportunities he moved to FC Eindhoven in the Dutch Second Division where he played over 50 matches. He moved back to the highest level of Belgian football with Mechelen, relegating to the Belgian Second Division in 2001 but promoting back in the following season. In 2003, Mechelen lost its football license and subsequently relegated to the Belgian Third Division, at which point Greven moved to Second Division team FC Brussels. With Brussels he promoted once again, enjoying another season at the highest level thereafter. In 2005, Greven moved to Second Division team OH Leuven, where he stayed until 2008, moving on to Mol-Wezel in the third division. In 2010, he moved to fourth division team Oosterzonen. Since 2011 he is active in the lower regional divisions of Belgian Football. 2019 is the start of his trainers career. He started with Atlas Linter and nowadays he's trainer at Heide Linter. His goal is to make these smaller clubs successful.

References

External links
 Profile - FC Antwerp

1973 births
Living people
Footballers from Flemish Brabant
Belgian footballers
Belgian Pro League players
Challenger Pro League players
Royal Antwerp F.C. players
FC Eindhoven players
K.V. Mechelen players
R.W.D.M. Brussels F.C. players
Oud-Heverlee Leuven players

Association football defenders
Lierse Kempenzonen players
Sportspeople from Leuven
Belgian expatriate sportspeople in the Netherlands
Belgian expatriate footballers
Expatriate footballers in the Netherlands